José Borges de Araújo de Moura Soeiro (born 11 August 1984, in Porto) is a Portuguese sociologist and politician, member of the Assembly of the Republic, first elected in 2005. He obtained his doctorate in Sociology from the University of Porto.

Works

 CARDINA, Miguel e SOEIRO, José (2013), "Esquerda Radical", in João Cardoso Rosas e Ana Rita Ferreira (orgs.), Ideologias Políticas Contemporâneas – Mudanças e Permanências, Coimbra: Almedina.
 SOEIRO, José; CARDINA, Miguel; SERRA, Nuno (coord.) (2013), Não Acredite em Tudo o que Pensa. Mitos do Senso Comum na Era da Austeridade. Lisboa, Tinta-da-China.

References

1984 births
21st-century Portuguese politicians
Living people
Portuguese sociologists
University of Porto alumni
People from Porto
Left Bloc politicians
Members of the Assembly of the Republic (Portugal)